The secretary of the Presidential Communications Office is the head of the Presidential Communications Office. Formerly known as the secretary of the Presidential Communications Operations Office during the administrations of Benigno Aquino III and Rodrigo Duterte, and briefly as the press secretary during the early part of the administration of Bongbong Marcos. The holder of the position also acts as the presidential spokesperson.

List

See also
Presidential spokesperson of the Philippines
Presidential Communications Group
Office of the President of the Philippines

References

Secretary
Office of the President of the Philippines
Presidency of the Philippines
Press secretaries